Bulbophyllum dischidiifolium is a species of orchid in the genus Bulbophyllum.

References

External links 
The Bulbophyllum-Checklist
The Internet Orchid Species Photo Encyclopedia

dischidiifolium